Consuelo Turetta (born 7 September 1961) is an Italian beach volleyball player. She competed in the women's tournament at the 1996 Summer Olympics.

References

1961 births
Living people
Italian women's beach volleyball players
Olympic beach volleyball players of Italy
Beach volleyball players at the 1996 Summer Olympics
Sportspeople from Padua